{{DISPLAYTITLE:C2H6N2O2}}
The molecular formula C2H6N2O2 (molar mass: 90.08 g/mol) may refer to:

 Methylazoxymethanol
 Dimethylnitramine
 Methylolurea
 Methyl carbazate
 2-Nitroethanamine
 N-Nitroethanamine